Obokh is a rural locality (a selo) in Gunibsky District, Republic of Dagestan, Russia. The population was 359 as of 2010.

Geography 
Obokh is located 23 km southeast of Gunib (the district's administrative centre) by road. Sogratl and Megeb are the nearest rural localities.

References 

Rural localities in Gunibsky District